Koneki was an Eclipse Incubator project created in May 2011 and archived in September 2015, that aims at providing Eclipse-based tools for M2M developers. The initial release of the project has been focusing on the creation of an IDE for the Lua programming language, and a simulator for OMA-DM communications.

Koneki project was part of the Eclipse M2M Industry Working Group initiative.

Lua Development Tools 

Koneki provides a complete IDE for Lua programming language, which is often used to develop the applications (metering, industrial control, healthcare, etc.) running in the embedded devices that are constituting the M2M networks.

Lua Developments Tools includes the following features: code completion, code folding, semantic highlighting, visual debugger…

OMA-DM simulator 

Koneki provides an interactive simulator that facilitates the debugging of OMA-DM communication scenarios, including firmware upgrade (FUMO) operations.

External links
 Koneki project page
 Lua Development Tools
 OMA-DM simulator

Eclipse (software)